Thánh Tông is the temple name used for several emperors of Vietnam. It may refer to:

Lý Thánh Tông (1023–1072, reigned 1054–1072), emperor of the Lý dynasty
Trần Thánh Tông (1240–1290, reigned 1258–1278), emperor of the Trần dynasty
Lê Thánh Tông (1442–1497, reigned 1460–1497), emperor of the Lê dynasty

Temple name disambiguation pages